Uegaki (written: 植垣) is a Japanese surname. Notable people with the surname include:

, Japanese handball player
Kento Uegaki (born 1990), Japanese handball player

Japanese-language surnames